Unthinkable is a 2010 American thriller film directed by Gregor Jordan and starring Samuel L. Jackson, Michael Sheen and Carrie-Anne Moss. It was released direct-to-video on June 14, 2010. The film is noteworthy for the controversy it generated around its subject matter, the torture of a man who threatens to detonate three nuclear bombs in three U.S. cities.

Plot 
An American man and former Delta Force operator, Yusuf, makes a videotape. When FBI Special Agent Helen Brody and her team see news bulletins looking for Yusuf, they launch an investigation, which is curtailed when they are summoned to a high school, which has been converted into a black site under military command. They are shown Yusuf's complete tape, where he threatens to detonate three nuclear bombs in separate U.S. cities if his demands are not met.

A special interrogator, "H", is brought in to force Yusuf to reveal the locations of the nuclear bombs. H quickly shows his capability and cruelty by chopping off one of Yusuf's fingers with a small hatchet. Horrified, Special Agent Brody attempts to put a stop to the measures. Her superiors make it clear that the potentially disastrous consequences necessitate these extreme measures. H escalates his methods, with Brody acting as the "good cop". Brody realizes that Yusuf anticipated that he would be tortured. Yusuf then makes his demands: he wants the President of the United States to announce a cessation of support for puppet governments and dictatorships in Muslim countries and a withdrawal of American troops from all Muslim countries. The group immediately dismisses the possibility of his demands being met, citing the U.S. government's declared policy of not negotiating with terrorists.

When Brody accuses a broken Yusuf of faking the bomb threat in order to make a point about the moral character of the United States as a nation, he breaks down and admits that it was all a ruse, giving her an address to prove it. They find a room that matches the scene in the video tape and find evidence on the roof. A soldier removes a picture from an electrical switch, which triggers a C-4 explosion at a nearby shopping mall that kills 53 people. Angry at the senseless deaths, Brody returns to Yusuf and cuts his chest with a scalpel. Yusuf is unafraid, claiming that she gave him a chance to recover his strength. He justifies the deaths in the shopping mall, stating that the Americans kill that many people every day. Yusuf says he allowed himself to be caught so he could face his oppressors.

H questions whether Yusuf will reveal the bombs' location unless Yusuf's wife is found. When she is detained, H brings her in front of her husband and threatens to mutilate her right there. Brody and the others begin to take her away from the room in disgust. Out of desperation, H slashes her throat, and she bleeds to death in front of Yusuf. Still without cooperation, H tells the soldiers to bring in Yusuf's two children, a young boy and girl. Outside of Yusuf's hearing, he assures everyone that he will not harm the children. Yusuf's children are brought in, and H makes it clear that he will torture them if the locations of the bombs are not divulged. Yusuf breaks and gives three addresses (in New York, Los Angeles, and Dallas), but H does not stop, forcing the others to intervene. Citing the amount of missing nuclear material Yusuf potentially had at his disposal (some 15–18 lbs. were reported missing, with about 4½ lbs. needed per device), H insists that Yusuf had not admitted anything about a heretofore-unreferenced fourth bomb. H points out that everything Yusuf has done so far has been planned meticulously. He knew the torture would most likely break him, and he would have been certain to plant a fourth bomb, just in case.

The purpose of the preceding torture was not to break Yusuf, but rather to make it clear what would happen to his children if he did not cooperate. The official in charge of the operation demands that H bring Yusuf's children back in for further interrogation. H demands that Brody bring the children back in because her decency will give him the moral approval that he needs to do the "unthinkable". When Brody refuses to retrieve the children for H, he unstraps Yusuf, sarcastically setting him free. The official draws his pistol and aims it at H to coerce him into further interrogation. Yusuf grabs the official's gun. He asks Brody to take care of his children and kills himself. Brody walks out of the building with Yusuf's children.

Extended version 
An FBI bomb disposal unit arrives at one of the disclosed locations and resets the timer, preventing the bomb from going off. As the FBI is celebrating, however, behind a nearby crate, the originally unconfirmed fourth bomb's timer counts down to zero.

Cast
Samuel L. Jackson - Henry Harold Humphries aka "H", a black-ops officer assigned to interrogate Yusuf.
Michael Sheen - Yusuf Atta Mohammed/Steven Arthur Younger, an American Muslim, former Delta Force operator, and bomb expert who has planted nuclear bombs in three U.S. cities. 
Carrie-Anne Moss - Special Agent Helen Brody, the leader of an FBI counter-terrorism team in Los Angeles assigned to interrogate Yusuf. 
Brandon Routh - Special Agent D.J. Jackson, a member of the FBI team from the Los Angeles Field Office. 
Benito Martinez - Alvarez, a black-ops officer and assistant of "H". 
Gil Bellows - Special Agent Paul Vincent, a member of the FBI team the Los Angeles Field Office. 
Joshua Harto - Special Agent Phillips, the newest agent in the Los Angeles Field Office. 
Martin Donovan - Assistant Director in Charge Jack Saunders, FBI Los Angeles Division director who assigns the interrogation
Stephen Root - Charles Thomson, an official with the Defense Intelligence Agency. 
Necar Zadegan - Jehan Younger, Yusuf's wife. 
Sasha Roiz as Master Sergeant Hich, the first interrogator of Yusuf. 
Michael Rose - Colonel Kerkmejian, second in command to General Paulson. 
Holmes Osborne - General Paulson, commander of the black site supervising the interrogation.

Reception 
Policy adviser Charles V. Peña opines that "Ultimately, [Unthinkable] is about the age-old question, 'Do the ends justify the means?'... In the end, Unthinkable doesn’t answer the question... but does provide plenty of food for thought". Despite praising its dramatic value, film scholar Matthew Alford argues that "the aesthetic realism and apparent seriousness of Unthinkable is a mask for the absurdity of its content and reactionary politics" making it not so much a "nightmare scenario" and more "a white paper from Freddy Krueger".

References

External links 

 
 
 

2010 direct-to-video films
2010 films
2010s political thriller films
American political thriller films
Films about nuclear war and weapons
Films about terrorism
Films directed by Gregor Jordan
Films scored by Graeme Revell
2010s English-language films
Torture in films
2010s American films